All-KML Team is an award for the top-tier professional basketball league in Estonia, the Korvpalli Meistriliiga (KML). It is the yearly selection of the league's top five basketball players, by position.

All-KML Team by season

See also
 Korvpalli Meistriliiga
 KML Most Valuable Player Award
 KML Finals Most Valuable Player Award
 KML Best Defender Award
 KML Best Young Player Award
 KML Coach of the Year

References

External links
 Official website

Korvpalli Meistriliiga
European basketball awards